Ethel Barrymore Theatre was a half-hour anthology television series hosted by Ethel Barrymore and the last series produced by the DuMont Television Network.

While produced by the network, the series was aired on Fridays at 8:30pm ET from September 21 to December 21, 1956 on DuMont station WABD after the network had closed. The series may have been filmed in 1953, and was known as Stage 8 in syndication.

Among the actors appearing were Arthur Kennedy, Charles Coburn, Anita Louise, Gene Lockhart, Eddie Bracken, and Akim Tamiroff.

Background
In 1952, Barrymore signed a contract with Interstate Television Corporation to work on The Ethel Barrymore Theatre as actress, advisor, and commentator. The contract included "a substantial salary plus residual rights".

The second episode produced by ITC in 1952 was Daughters of Mars, which starred Barrymore, Selena Royle, Elizabeth Risdon, and Phillip Terry. The director was Lewis Allen, and the producer was Lee Savin.

Episode status
As with most DuMont series, no episodes are known to exist.

See also
List of programs broadcast by the DuMont Television Network
List of surviving DuMont Television Network broadcasts

References

Bibliography
David Weinstein, The Forgotten Network: DuMont and the Birth of American Television (Philadelphia: Temple University Press, 2004) 
Alex McNeil, Total Television, Fourth edition (New York: Penguin Books, 1980) 
Tim Brooks and Earle Marsh, The Complete Directory to Prime Time Network TV Shows, Third edition (New York: Ballantine Books, 1964)

External links
Ethel Barrymore Theatre at IMDB
List of episodes at CTVA
DuMont historical website

DuMont Television Network original programming
1956 American television series debuts
1956 American television series endings
1950s American anthology television series
Black-and-white American television shows